The 2nd constituency of Haute-Saône is a French legislative constituency in the Haute-Saône département. Like the other 576 French constituencies, it elects one MP using a two round electoral system.

Description

The 2nd constituency of Haute-Saône is centered on the small towns of Héricourt and Lure it covers the eastern portion of the department. The borders of the constituency created for the 2012 election match those of the old 1st Constituency which existed between 1958 and 1986 after which Haute-Saône had three constituencies before reverting to two in 2012.

From 1981 until 2002 the seat was held Jean-Pierre Michel first elected as a Socialist before he joined Jean-Pierre Chevènement's breakaway Citizen's Movement in 1993. The conservative UMP took the seat at the 2002 election before quickly losing it to the Socialists in 2007.

The Socialist Jean-Michel Villaumé was narrowly re-elected with a majority of
just 246 at the 2012 election suggesting the seat can be classified as marginal.

In 2017, Christophe Lejeune won the seat for President Emmanuel Macron's centrist LREM party, but lost re-election to Emeric Salmon of the far-right RN party.

Historic Representation

Election results

2022

2017

 
 
 
 
 
 
 
 
|-
| colspan="8" bgcolor="#E9E9E9"|
|-

2012

 
 
 
 
 
|-
| colspan="8" bgcolor="#E9E9E9"|
|-

Sources

Official results of French elections from 2002: "Résultats électoraux officiels en France" (in French).

2